Reggio di Calabria Aeroporto is a railway station in Reggio Calabria serving Reggio Calabria Airport, Italy. The station is located on the Jonica railway . The train services are operated by Trenitalia.

The station lies 1 km from the airport; there is a free shuttle bus service between the two.

Train services
The station is served by the following service(s):

Regional services (Treno regionale) Cantanzaro Lido - Roccella Jonica - Melito di Porto Salvo - Reggio Calabria
Metropolitan services (Treno regionale) Rosarno - Villa San Giovanni - Reggio Calabria - Melito di Porto Salvo

References

Railway stations in Calabria
Buildings and structures in the Province of Reggio Calabria
Airport railway stations in Italy
Railway stations opened in 2014
2014 establishments in Italy
Railway stations in Italy opened in the 21st century